Czech Lion Award for Best TV Series is one of the awards given to the best Czech television series. Category was founded in 2015.

Winners

References

Television awards
Czech Lion Awards
Awards established in 2015
Czech television awards